Alpine borane is the commercial name for an organoboron compound that is used in organic synthesis.  It is a colorless liquid, although it is usually encountered as a solution.

Preparation and reactions
This reagent is generated by treating 9-BBN with α-pinene.

This sterically crowded chiral trialkylborane can stereoselectively reduce aldehydes in what is known as the Midland Alpine borane reduction, or simply the Midland reduction.
C8H12B-pinanyl + RCDO → C8H12BOCHDR + (+)-d-pinene

Hydrolysis of the resulting borinic ester affords the alcohol:
C8H12BOCHDR + H2O → C8H12BOH + HOCHDR

It is also effective for the stereoselective reduction of certain acetylenic ketones.

The reaction is proposed to involve formation of an adduct by coordination of the carbonyl oxygen to boron. Intramolecular hydride transfer from the pinane substituent to the carbonyl carbon ensues.

Related reagents
A range of alkyl-substituted borane are specialty reagents in organic synthesis.  Two such reagents that are closely related to Alpine borane are 9-BBN and diisopinocampheylborane.

References 

Organoboranes
Reducing agents